Just Girls were a Portuguese girl group consisting of Ana Maria Velez, Diana Monteiro, Helga Posser and Kiara Timas.

The band was created when TVI cast a band for Morangos com Açucar.

In 2007, their first CD, Just Girls was released. "Just Girls" has been certificated four times platinum in Portugal. Their most recent album, Play Me, has been certificated two times platinum in Portugal. They sold over 220,000 records in Portugal.

Discography

Studio albums

Singles

The Single "O Jogo Já Começou" entered the chart on position 23 and it peaked on number 11.

Year-end chart

"O Jogo Já Começou"

Music videos
 "O Jogo Já Começou" 
 "Ser Radical" 
 "Entre o Sonho e a Ilusão"

DVDs

External links
 Just Girls
 Clube de Fans Just Girls

Portuguese pop music groups
Musical groups established in 2007
2007 establishments in Portugal
Portuguese girl groups